Thomas Weston Thompson (March 15, 1766October 1, 1821) was an American attorney and Federalist politician in the U.S. state of New Hampshire. He served as a United States representative and United States Senator during the 1800s.

Early life and career 
Thompson was born in Boston in the Province of Massachusetts Bay, the son of Thomas and Isabella Thompson. The family moved to Newburyport, Massachusetts when Thompson was young. He attended Dummer Academy in Byfield, Massachusetts, and served as an aide to General Lincoln during Shays' Rebellion. Thompson graduated from Harvard University in 1786 and began studying for the ministry. He was a tutor at Harvard from 1789 to 1791.

He read law, was admitted to the bar in 1791 and practiced law in Salisbury, New Hampshire from 1791 to 1810. Among the younger men he mentored was Daniel Webster, who started as a law apprentice with him around 1801. Thompson was appointed postmaster of Salisbury, serving from 1798 to 1803. He served for more than two decades as a trustee of Dartmouth College, from 1801 to 1821.

Political career 
In 1810, Thompson moved to Concord, New Hampshire where he continued the practice of law. He was elected as a member of the New Hampshire House of Representatives, serving from 1807 to 1808. He was treasurer of New Hampshire in 1810. He was reelected to serve in the State House from 1813 to 1814 and elected Speaker.

Thompson was elected as a Federalist to the Ninth U.S. Congress, serving from March 4, 1805 to March 3, 1807. He was appointed state treasurer of New Hampshire from 1809 to 1811. Thompson was elected to the United States Senate to fill the vacancy caused by the death of Nicholas Gilman, serving from June 24, 1814 to March 3, 1817.

He died in Concord in 1821; interment was in the Old North Cemetery.

Personal life 
Thompson married Elizabeth C. Porter on December 25, 1796. They had two sons, William Coombs Thompson and Charles Edward Thompson.

References

External links 

1766 births
1821 deaths
Politicians from Boston
Politicians from Newburyport, Massachusetts
Harvard University alumni
New Hampshire postmasters
Members of the New Hampshire House of Representatives
Speakers of the New Hampshire House of Representatives
United States senators from New Hampshire
Federalist Party United States senators
Federalist Party members of the United States House of Representatives from New Hampshire
Lawyers from Boston
American lawyers admitted to the practice of law by reading law
19th-century American lawyers
The Governor's Academy alumni